Elizabeth Cervantes (born August 1, 1973) is a Mexican actress of films and soap operas. She studied acting in Casa del Teatro and Centro de Formacion Actoral of TV Azteca.

Filmography

Cine 
 El Infierno - La Lupe (2010)
Oscura Seduccion (2010)
 De la infancia - Xaviera (2009)
 Borderland - Anna (2007)
 Mas que a nada en el mundo - Emilia (2006)
 Fuera del cielo - Rebeca (2006)
 Febrer - Cristina (2004)
 Volverás - Marta (2002)

Television 
 Los Rey - Paola Garces Garza de Rey(2012)
 Drenaje Profundo - Rita (2010)
 Vivir por ti - Natalia (2008)
 Decisiones (2007)
 Marina - Sara (2006)
 Gitanas - Érendira (2004)
 El alma herida - Bertha (2003)
 La duda - Valentina (2002)
 Amores... Querer con Alevosía - Matilde Morales (2001)
Asi en el barrio como en el cielo - estrella lopez de lopez (2015)

References

External links

1973 births
Living people
21st-century Mexican actresses
Mexican film actresses
Mexican telenovela actresses
People educated at Centro de Estudios y Formación Actoral